"Bello e Impossibile" ('Handsome and impossible') is a song composed by Gianna Nannini and Fabio Pianigiani and performed by Gianna Nannini. The single peaked at second place  on the Italian hit parade, being awarded double platinum. It was also awarded platinum in Austria and Switzerland, and gold disc in Germany. Mexican singer Alejandra Guzmán covered the song for her debut album Bye Mamá (1988).

Chart positions

Track listing
7" single – SRL 11047    
 "Bello e Impossibile" (Nannini - Pianigiani) -  	 4:04
 "Vampiro canzone" (Nannini) -  	1:50

12" maxi-single – SRLM 2066      
 "Bello e Impossibile"  (Nannini - Pianigiani)	 -  4:39
 	"Come Una Schiava" (Nannini -  Raffaella Riva) 	 - 5:42

References

 

1986 singles
Italian songs
1986 songs
Gianna Nannini songs
Songs written by Gianna Nannini